Couzinet may refer to:

People

 Émile Couzinet (1896-1964), French film director
 René Couzinet (1904-1956), founder of French aerospace manufacturer
 Maurice Couzinet, actor
 David Couzinet, rugby union player

Industry

 Société des Avions René Couzinet French aerospace manufacturer  
 Couzinet 10 'Arc en Ciel'
 Couzinet 21
 Couzinet 22
 Couzinet 27 'Arc en Ciel'
 Couzinet 30
 Couzinet 33 'Biarritz'
 Couzinet 33 No.2
 Couzinet 40
 Couzinet 70 'Arc en Ciel III'. 1930s French three-engined commercial monoplane built by Société des Avions René Couzinet.
 Couzinet 80
 Couzinet 100
 Couzinet 101
 Couzinet 103